Ratagnon (also translated as Latagnon or Datagnon, and Aradigi) is a regional language spoken by the Ratagnon people, an indigenous group from Occidental Mindoro. It is a part of the Bisayan language family and is closely related to other Philippine languages. Its speakers are shifting to Tagalog. In 2000, there were only two to five speakers of the language. However, in 2010 Ethnologue had reported there were 310 new speakers.

Classification
Ratagnon is closely related to the Cuyonon language, a Bisayan language spoken in the Cuyo Archipelago just to the south of Mindoro.

This may be brought about by migrations of Cuyonons to the southern tip of Mindoro, akin to their migrations to mainland Palawan, a very much gradual process. It could be inferred that these migrations happened at an earlier date before the migrations to mainland Palawan started (around the mid- to late 19th century) due to its diversion from the Cuyonon language (Given that Ratagnon descended from an older language spoken in the general area West of Panay, Ratagnon and Cuyonon are classified under Kuyan), whereas the Cuyonon of mainland Palawan, Calamian and that of the Cuyo itself remain the same language with relatively little dialectal difference.

Distribution
According to the Ethnologue, Ratagnon is spoken in the southernmost extreme tip of Mindoro islands, including the municipalities of Magsaysay and Bulalacao.
Magsaysay, Occidental Mindoro
Bulalacao, Oriental Mindoro

 lists the following locations.
lower Caguray River near Santa Teresa, Magsaysay, Occidental Mindoro
San Nicolas, Magsaysay, Occidental Mindoro
Bamban, Magsaysay, Occidental Mindoro

Vocabulary
Barbian (1977) provides lexical and phonological data for Ratagnon.

In contrast to Cuyonon, Ratagnon dropped the schwa  sound, instead opting for a u/o sound. It too borrowed lexical terms from the languages of its Mangyan neighbors and to a lesser extent Spanish It is notable in Barbian's Mangyan – English Vocabulary,  Ratagnon might have already experienced heavy Tagalization, present in words such as 'heart',  in Cuyonon, albeit  in Ratagnon, same with Tagalog's . This phenomenon is also observed in the Hanunuo traditions of Urukay, perhaps closely related to the Erekay of the Cuyonons, both being a form of Balagtasan. Ratagnon also has terms specific to the lowland river surroundings which are not present in modern Cuyonon, most of which are borrowings from Hanunuo and Buhid, whereas a few are either archaic Cuyonon terms or innovations made within the Ratagnon language. Aside from the aforementioned differences from the Cuyonon language, the two languages are still very much mutually intelligible.

Differences from Cuyonon include:

The usage of the t sound over the d sound, present in:

Usage of the k sound over the g sound:

The aforementioned dropping of the schwa for the u sound present in:

The preference for the l over the r sound:

There are some words that differ in meaning between Cuyonon and Ratagnon; this is most notable in terms specific to their respective surroundings, which has created false friends with almost the same, yet different, meanings.

Notes

References

 
 
 

Visayan languages
Endangered Austronesian languages
Languages of Occidental Mindoro